The San Diego Toreros men's basketball statistical leaders are individual statistical leaders of the San Diego Toreros men's basketball program in various categories, including points, assists, blocks, rebounds, and steals. Within those areas, the lists identify single-game, single-season, and career leaders. The Toreros represent  the University of San Diego in the NCAA's West Coast Conference.

San Diego began competing in intercollegiate basketball in 1955.  The NCAA did not officially record assists as a stat until the 1983–84 season, and blocks and steals until the 1985–86 season, but San Diego's record books includes players in these stats before these seasons. These lists are updated through the end of the 2020–21 season.

Scoring

Rebounds

Assists

Steals

Blocks

References

San Diego
Statistical